The Men's 100m T13 had its competition held on September 13, with the first round at 9:10 and the Final at 17:45.

Medalists

Results

References
Round 1 - Heat 1
Round 1 - Heat 2
Final

Athletics at the 2008 Summer Paralympics